The Ohre is a river in northern Germany, left tributary to the Elbe. Its source is north of Wolfsburg, in Lower Saxony. It flows generally south-east, at first following the border of Lower Saxony and Saxony-Anhalt. After Buchhorst it flows completely through Saxony-Anhalt, along the Mittellandkanal. It flows into the Elbe in Rogätz, north of Magdeburg. The towns Brome, Calvörde, Haldensleben and Wolmirstedt lie along the river. The upper course of the Ohre is in the Drömling nature reserve.

Between the end of the Second World War and German reunification, the Ohre separated East from West Germany and so formed part of the Inner German border.

See also
List of rivers of Lower Saxony
List of rivers of Saxony-Anhalt

References

Rivers of Lower Saxony
Rivers of Saxony-Anhalt
Rivers of Germany